Kasabonika Airport  is an airport located  west of the First Nations community of Kasabonika, Ontario, Canada.

It services the Kasabonika Lake First Nations Community and has passenger and cargo services. 
Wasaya Airlines fly cargo flights here to supply the local Northern Store and also provide mail services from Canada Post.
North Star Airlines provide cargo services on request and provide all package mail services for Canada Post.

Airlines and destinations

References

External links

Certified airports in Kenora District